Andrew Patterson (born 4 September 1975) is a former Irish and Sussex cricketer, who now works as a PE teacher.

Cricket career
He was a right-handed batsman and a wicket-keeper. He made his debut for Ireland against Wales in 1996, and went on to play for them in 61 matches, including two ICC Trophy tournaments. He also played for Northern Ireland in the cricket tournament at the 1998 Commonwealth Games, county cricket for Sussex and minor counties cricket for Bedfordshire.

Post cricket career
After retirement from professional cricket, Patterson became a PE teacher at Caterham School in Surrey.

Personal and family life
His brother Mark also played for Ireland and Bedfordshire.

In 2013, Patterson was diagnosed with spastic paraplegia and in 2020 was given the prognosis that he will require a wheelchair.

References

1975 births
Living people
Irish cricketers
Sussex cricketers
Cricketers from Northern Ireland
Bedfordshire cricketers
Cricketers at the 1998 Commonwealth Games
Cricketers from Belfast
Commonwealth Games competitors for Northern Ireland
Wicket-keepers